Sinop Province (Sinopi) is a province of Turkey, along the Black Sea. It is located between 41 and 42 degrees North latitude and between 34 and 35 degrees East longitude. The surface area is 5,862 km2, equivalent to 0.8% of Turkey's surface area. The borders total 475 km and consists of 300 km of land and 175 km seaside borders. Its adjacent provinces are Kastamonu on the west, Çorum on the south, and Samsun on the southeast. 

The provincial capital is the city of Sinop.

Geography

Rivers
Kızılırmak, Gökırmak, Sarsak çay, Karasu, Ayancık Suyu, Tepeçay, Çakıroğlu, Kanlıdere

Lakes
Sülüklü, Sarıkum

Bays
Hamsilos Bay

Districts

Sinop province is divided into 9 districts (capital district in bold):
Ayancık
Boyabat
Dikmen
Durağan
Erfelek
Gerze
Saraydüzü
Sinop
Türkeli

History

It was part of Kastamonu Vilayet during the late Ottoman period.

References

External links
 Sinop governor's official website 
 Sinop municipality's official website 
 Sinop local news website